Moment of Impact is the debut studio album by American rock band Eye Empire. A 1,000-copy limited edition was released on December 12, 2010, with a full release on September 14, 2011. It features guest appearances from singer Lajon Witherspoon and drummer Morgan Rose of Sevendust. It was later released as an expanded edition double album, with the title shortened to Impact.

Track listing

Personnel 
Eye Empire
 Donald Carpenter – lead vocals
 B.C. Kochmit – guitar, backing vocals
 Corey Lowery – bass, backing vocals
 Ryan Bennett – drums on "Angels & Demons" and "Don't Lie to Me"

Additional personnel
 Morgan Rose – drums, percussion
 Lajon Witherspoon – vocals on "Victim (of the System)"

References

External links 
 

2011 debut albums
Eye Empire albums